James Fawcett is a former Republican member of the Kansas House of Representatives representing the 65th district, which includes Junction City and Alta Vista and parts of Geary and Wabasunsee Counties, from 2011 until 2013. Fawcett attended Washburn University for his BA in History/Political Science and studied banking at the University of Colorado Graduate School of Banking. Fawcett served in the 101st Airborne Division leaving the service in 1975 as a disabled Vietnam veteran with the rank of captain.

Committee membership
 Veterans, Military and Homeland Security
 Financial Institutions
 Insurance
 Transportation

References

External links 
 Kansas Legislature
 Kansas Legislature Standing Committees
 Kansas Legislature Member Profiles

Living people
Year of birth missing (living people)
Republican Party members of the Kansas House of Representatives
21st-century American politicians
Washburn University alumni
University of Colorado alumni